The 2017 Amgen Tour of California Women's Race (also known as the Amgen Breakaway from Heart Disease Women's Race empowered with SRAM for sponsorship reasons) was the third edition of the women's Tour of California cycling stage race. It ran from 11 to 14 May 2017, and was part of the 2017 UCI Women's World Tour; the race started in South Lake Tahoe and finished in Sacramento.

The race was won on the final day by  rider Anna van der Breggen, surpassing 's Katie Hall thanks to bonus seconds won at an intermediate sprint. As a result, van der Breggen took the lead of the Women's World Tour standings.

Teams
17 teams participated in the 2017 Tour of California; 16 teams announced in March 2017, with further amendments made to the field in the week leading up to the race.

Schedule
The full race route was announced on 31 January 2017.

Stages

Stage 1
11 May 2017 — South Lake Tahoe to South Lake Tahoe,

Stage 2
12 May 2017 — South Lake Tahoe to South Lake Tahoe,

Stage 3
13 May 2017 — Elk Grove to Sacramento,

Stage 4
14 May 2017 — Sacramento to Sacramento,

Classification leadership table
In the 2017 Tour of California, five different jerseys were awarded. For the general classification, calculated by adding each cyclist's finishing times on each stage, and allowing time bonuses for the first three finishers at intermediate sprints and at the finish of mass-start stages, the leader received a yellow jersey. This classification was considered the most important of the 2017 Tour of California, and the winner of the classification was considered the winner of the race.

Additionally, there was a sprints classification, which awarded a green jersey. In the sprints classification, cyclists received points for finishing in the top 10 in a stage. For winning a stage, a rider earned 15 points, with 12 for second, 9 for third, 7 for fourth with a point fewer per place down to a single point for 10th place. Points towards the classification could also be accrued – awarded on a 3–2–1 scale – at intermediate sprint points during each stage; these intermediate sprints also offered bonus seconds towards the general classification. There was also a mountains classification, the leadership of which was marked by a white jersey with red polka dots. In the mountains classification, points were won by reaching the top of a climb before other cyclists, with more points available for the higher-categorised climbs.

The fourth jersey represented the young rider classification, marked by a predominantly "white design" jersey. This was decided in the same way as the general classification, but only riders born after 1 January 1992 were eligible to be ranked in the classification. There was also a classification for teams, in which the times of the best three cyclists per team on each stage were added together; the leading team at the end of the race was the team with the lowest total time. In addition, there was a combativity award given after each stage to the rider considered, by a jury, to have "who best exemplifies the character of those engaged in the fight against cancer / heart disease", in line with the jersey's sponsors. This award was marked by a blue jersey.

References

Sources

External links

women
2017 in American sports
2017 in sports in California
2017 UCI Women's World Tour
May 2017 sports events in the United States
Women's sports in California